Mark or Mahalia, sixteenth bishop of Jerusalem (served 135 – died 156) was the first non-Jewish bishop of Jerusalem, renamed as Aelia Capitolina. 

His secretary was traditionally thought to have been Aristo of Pella, though the Armenian chronicler Movses Khorenatsi’s evidence for this is scanty, late (7th Century) and ambiguous. 

He is listed in the Roman Martyrology on Oct. 22. His successor was the Bishop Cassianus of Jerusalem.

References

Saints from the Holy Land
2nd-century bishops of Jerusalem
156 deaths
2nd-century Christian saints
Year of birth unknown